Miyahara Ice Cream is a confectionery, restaurant, and ice cream parlor in Central District, Taichung, Taiwan. The building is converted from a former ophthalmologist clinic dating to 1927, hence its Chinese name. The building is operated by Dawncake (日出), a Taichung-based confectionery brand.

History 
 was born on December 13, 1874 in Chiran, Kagoshima Prefecture.

In 1927, Miyahara opened a clinic in Taichung on the banks of the Lu River. At the time, it was the largest eye clinic in the city. Wanting to move to a bigger building but lacking the funds to do so, the bureau came to an agreement with local businessman Zhang Ruizhen (張瑞楨): Zhang would finance the construction of the new expansion in exchange for the old building. The bureau moved to its new location in 1959, near the current .

Afterwards, the building was occupied by a wide range of tenants, including a clinic for sexually transmitted infections, a cram school, a dumpling restaurant, a hairdresser, two taxi and bus dispatch companies, and more. After several disagreements, Zhang forcefully evicted the tenants in 1964, and in 1970 the building was used as an office for the newspaper Taiwan Daily. The building sustained heavy damage in the 1999 Jiji earthquake and the 2008 Typhoon Kalmaegi, and after the typhoon, the building was in ruins and abandoned.

In 2010, Dawncake purchased the ruins, and over the next two years, refurbished the building into a restaurant. The store opened to the public in 2012. After the success of Miyahara Ice Cream, the Dawncake group also refurbished the nearby Fourth Credit Union, a former bank, in a similar manner.

Architecture 
Miyahara Ice Cream is located at the corner of Zhongshan Road and Luchuan East Road, on the banks of the Lu River. It is a four-story structural steel building: the bottom two floors uses the original brick structure as a facade and preserved the building's qilou, and the top two floors is a newly-added space covered by architectural glass in a style similar to a mansard roof. The first floor sells ice cream and various pastries, while the second floor is a Taiwanese cuisine restaurant named "Moon Pavilion", which a "Bib Gourmand" eatery in the Michelin Guide. The atrium in the interior is often paralleled to that of Hogwarts in the Harry Potter franchise.

Miyahara Ice Cream is commonly cited as one of the earliest urban renewal projects in Central District in the 2010s.

Gallery

See also 
 Taichung City Second Market

References 

Restaurants in Taiwan
Tourist attractions in Taichung